Marcin Suchański (born 23 June 1977 in Bytom) is a Polish footballer who plays for POLONIA BYTOM.

Career

Club
In February 2011, he joined Ruch Radzionków on a one-year contract.

References

External links
 

1977 births
Living people
Polish footballers
Association football goalkeepers
Górnik Zabrze players
Polonia Bytom players
GKS Tychy players
Ruch Radzionków players
Zagłębie Sosnowiec players
Sportspeople from Bytom